Zion Lutheran Church is a historic Lutheran church in Athens, Greene County, New York.  It was built in 1853 and features a pair of wooden Doric order columns in antis and brick pilasters.  The brick church is in the Greek Revival style and has a square, two stage tower.

It was added to the National Register of Historic Places in 1980.

References

Lutheran churches in New York (state)
Churches on the National Register of Historic Places in New York (state)
Churches completed in 1853
19th-century Lutheran churches in the United States
Churches in Greene County, New York
National Register of Historic Places in Greene County, New York